Nabivand (also Romanized as Nabīvand; also known as Banīvand) is a village in Nurali Rural District, in the Central District of Delfan County, Lorestan Province, Iran. At the 2006 census, its population was 387, in 97 families.

References 

Towns and villages in Delfan County